The two dollar coin is the third-highest denomination coin of the Hong Kong dollar. Since its introduction in 1976, it is one of two circulating coins to not be round (the twenty cent coin is also not round). The two dollar coin is a dodecagonal scallop in shape, and made of cupro-nickel.

It was issued in 1975, and thus became the highest denomination coin until the five dollar coin was introduced the next year. The coin was a new denomination to the Hong Kong monetary system, as suggested by the Coinage Review Committee.

The obverse featured Queen Elizabeth II from its introduction until being replaced with the Bauhinia flower in 1993, which featured on all Hong Kong coins minted since that year. In 1997 a commemorative coin was issued featuring the two saints of harmony, the He He brothers, to commemorate the handover of Hong Kong, from the United Kingdom to China.

Mintage

References

Further reading
 Ma Tak Wo (2004), Illustrated Catalogue of Hong Kong Currency, Ma Tak Wo Numismatic Co., LTD Kowloon Hong Kong. .

Coins of Hong Kong
Two-base-unit coins